Sretensky District is an administrative and municipal district (raion), one of the thirty-one in Zabaykalsky Krai, Russia. It is located in the east of the krai, and borders with Mogochinsky District in the north, Gazimuro-Zavodsky District in the east, and with  District in the west. Its administrative center is the town of Sretensk. Population:  27,524 (2002 Census);  The population of Sretensk accounts for 29.4% of the district's total population.

History
The district was established on January 26, 1926.

References

Notes

Sources

Districts of Zabaykalsky Krai
States and territories established in 1926

